There is a small  which consists mainly of expatriates from Japan or Indian-born people of Japanese ancestry.

Settlement

Bangalore
In Bangalore, the Japanese community has increased by approximately 3000 in the last few years. The vast majority of the community works for Toyota Kirloskar, Honda, Fujitsu, Komatsu, Hitachi, Tsujikawa, Keihin, and 80 other Japanese corporates. Bangalore attracts over 1800 Japanese business visitors every month. The Karnataka government has announced to set up an industrial township on 1,000 acres of land outside Bangalore for Japanese manufacturers. The Department of Foreign Languages at Bangalore University teaches Japanese. Bangalore has a Japanese-influenced Sakra World Hospital, a Kenkos store for lifestyle products. 

The Japanese Association of Bengaluru runs a Japanese Supplementary School Hoshū jugyō kō or (補習授業校), or hoshūkō (補習校) in the premises of Trio World Academy. which is a Japanese-friendly school. 

Japan Habba (Japan Festival) has been held in Bangalore since 2005 and about 1,000 Japanese people from various parts of India travel to Bangalore to join in the festival.
Many Japanese restaurants exist in Bangalore, and some are owned by Japanese people.

Chennai
Chennai is home to the largest Japanese community in India around 8200  members. Chennai has traditionally respected and valued Japanese culture and discipline.  As of 2015, around 577 Japanese companies are present in Chennai, which represents more than a third of the Japanese companies in India. Japanese language centers have sprung up and American International School Chennai has opened a center that teaches the language; there are about 55 Japanese restaurants while hotels continue to add Japanese cuisine to their menus. The Japanese influence in the city has resulted in a keen interest in the Japanese language among the people of Chennai, who learn it to better understand Japanese culture and the language's traditional linguistic similarity to Tamil, the official language of Tamil Nadu. Some also learn Japanese to explore new business opportunities. The Indo-Japan Chamber of Commerce and Industry (IJCCI) aims to increase cultural competence between India and Japan. They regularly host Japanese cultural events to expose the Chennai community to an otherwise unknown culture.  Chennai has the largest number of JLPT test takers among the cities that offer the test in India. 

The number of Japanese expatriates is expected to rise with the development of a 1500-acre Japanese township on the outskirts of Chennai.

Haldia
The Japanese community of Haldia is mostly engineers and top executives at Mitsubishi Chemicals Corporation’s (MCC) PTA (Purified Terephthalic Acid) plant in the city. The community have been living in the mini Japanese township called Sataku (Japantown) for many years. Sataku has many Japanese restaurants and a local Japanese news station. Japanese movies are also shown in local theaters. Haldia is the only Indian city to have a Japantown.

The only problem for tourists to this Japantown is that it is not open to public. You need to be invited as a guest of one of the residents to gain entry to the complex. Also, the exact location is not available on Google Maps and not known to most locals or local traffic police. It is located in the Huzur tehsil and the Phanda block. According to the 2011 census of India, Haldia Sataku has a population of 1,814 people.

The commissioning of the PTA plant and subsequent expansions have seen the arrival of many Japanese executives. While a few have returned, many stayed back in this quaint township, thousands of miles away from their home land. The next phase of expansion promises to bring in more Japanese expatriates to this new industrial hub in West Bengal.

Gujarat
There were 321 Japanese establishments and 347 Japanese citizens residing in Gujarat as of March 2019.

Education

List of Japanese international schools in India:
 Mumbai Japanese School
 Japanese School New Delhi

Supplementary programmes (hoshu jugyo ko or hoshuko): 
 Japanese School of Bangalore (バンガロール日本人補習授業校 Bangarōru Nihonjin Hoshū Jugyō Kō)
 Japanese School Educational Trust of Chennai (チェンナイ補習授業校 Chennai Hoshū Jugyō Kō) - located at American International School Chennai, Taramani. Established by the Japanese Association in Chennai (チェンナイ日本人会 Chennai Nihonjin Kai), it opened in June 1975 as the Japanese Class of Madras (マドラス日本語補習教室 Madorasu Nihongo Hoshū Kyōshitsu). In 1998 the school adopted the name Japanese Language School of Chennai (チェンナイ日本語補習校 Chennai  Nihongo Hoshū Jugyō Kō) since Madras took the name Chennai. The school moved to AIS Chennai in 2003. It adopted its current name in 2005 so it could register as a trust, as per the Trust Act.

The Calcutta Japanese School (カルカタ日本人学校 Karukata Nihonjin Gakkō), a day school was established but not longer exists. The hoshuko in Kolkata also closed.

Notable people
 Arata Izumi (和泉新) - Indian national football player (Originally from Shimonoseki, Yamaguchi, Japan)
 Ashok Sukumaran - Japanese-born Indian contemporary artist (Originally from Sapporo, Hokkaido, Japan)
 Surai Sasai (佐々井秀嶺) - Japanese-born Indian Buddhist bhikkhu (monk) (Originally from Niimi, Okayama, Japan)
 Katsumi Yusa (遊佐 克美) - Football player (Originally from Fukushima, Fukushima, Japan)
 Kimiko Yanagida (柳田公子) - Odissi Dancer
 Masako Ono (小野 雅子) - Japanese Odissi dancer (Originally from Tokyo, Japan)
 Ryuji Sueoka (末岡 龍二) - Football player (Originally from Hikari, Yamaguchi, Japan)
 Takayuki Omi (近江 孝行) - Football player (Originally from Ōtsu, Shiga, Japan)
 Priyanka Yoshikawa (吉川 プリアンカ) - Beauty queen (Originally from Tokyo, Japan)
 Samir Rishu Mohanty - Indian Rapper

See also
 India-Japan relations
 Indians in Japan
 Japanese language education in India
 Japan-India Association

References

India
India–Japan relations
 
 
Japanese
Japanese diaspora in Asia